Rocki is a surname. Notable people with the surname include:

Marek Rocki (born 1953), Polish econometrician
Piotr Rocki (1974–2020), Polish footballer

See also
Rocky (nickname)

Polish-language surnames